Middlesceugh is a hamlet in the civil parish of Skelton, in the Eden district, in the county of Cumbria, England. Middlesceugh has a SSSI called Middlesceugh Woods And Pastures.

References

External links 

 http://www.genuki.org.uk/big/eng/CUL/Carlisle/StMary/index.html

Hamlets in Cumbria
Skelton, Cumbria
Inglewood Forest